Zapodje is a small settlement in the hills above Zgornji Hotič in the Municipality of Litija in central Slovenia. The area is part of the traditional region of Upper Carniola and is now included with the rest of the municipality in the Central Sava Statistical Region.

References

External links

Zapodje on Geopedia

Populated places in the Municipality of Litija